John Bunyan was 17th-century English writer and preacher.

John Bunyan may also refer to:

John Bunyan (American football) (1905–1989)
John Bunyan (sportsperson), dual player from County Kerry
John Bunyan Bristol (1826–1909), an American landscape painter
John Bunyan Reeve (1831–1916), an American minister and professor at Howard University
John Bunyan Shearer, (1832–1919), president of Davidson College
John Bunyan Slaughter (1848–1928), an American rancher and banker